Petr Cornelie (born July 26, 1995) is a French professional basketball player for Real Madrid of the Spanish Liga ACB and the EuroLeague. He stands 210 cm (6'11'’) tall and plays both the power forward and the center spots. Cornelie was selected by the Denver Nuggets with the 53rd pick of the 2016 NBA draft.

Early life and career 
Growing up in Alsace, Cornelie played in the youth ranks of Saint-Joseph Strasbourg, Basket Club Souffelweyersheim and Association sportive d'Electricité de Strasbourg.

Professional career

Le Mans Sarthe (2013–2019) 
At the age of 15, Cornelie joined the youth academy of Le Mans Sarthe Basket. He made his debut on Le Mans' men's team during the 2013–14 season and became a regular on the team the following season. In the 2014–15 season he won the Pro A Rising Star award.

On June 13, 2016, Cornelie was one of 13 different international underclassmen (including one of four other Frenchmen) to enter their names for the 2016 NBA draft. Cornelie was eventually picked by the Denver Nuggets 53rd pick and joined them for the 2016 NBA Summer League. He remained at Le Mans for the 2016–17 campaign. After a disappointing season, in which he averaged 4.1 points and 2.9 rebounds a game for Le Mans, Cornelie joined another Pro A club, the Levallois Metropolitans, on loan in June 2017.

Pau-Orthez (2019–2021) 
On June 20, 2019, Cornelie signed a deal with Élan Béarnais Pau-Orthez of the French LNB Pro A.

Denver Nuggets (2021–2022)
On September 17, 2021, Cornelie signed a two-way contract with the Denver Nuggets. Under the terms of the deal, he split time between the Nuggets and their NBA G League affiliate, the Grand Rapids Gold. On January 9, 2022, he was waived by the Nuggets.

Grand Rapids Gold (2022)
On January 15, 2022, Cornelie was acquired via returning player rights by the Grand Rapids Gold.

Real Madrid (2022–present)
On July 27, 2022, Cornelie returned to Europe to sign with Real Madrid for one year.

International career
Cornelie played for France at the 2012 U17 World Championships in Lithuania, at the 2013 U18 European Championships in Latvia and at the 2015 U20 European Championships in Italy.

Career statistics

NBA

Regular season

|-
| style="text-align:left;"| 
| style="text-align:left;"| Denver
| 13 || 0 || 2.9 || .333 || .125 || .750 || 1.1 || .2 || .1 || .1 || 1.1

Personal life
His mother, Pavla Sigmundova, is a former Czech basketball player and his father, Martial Cornelie, played basketball in the Pro B, the second-tier of French basketball. Petr's sister, Jodie Cornelie-Sigmundova, played internationally for the French junior national teams and spent four years on the University of Dayton Flyers women's basketball team.

References

External links
 Profile on eurobasket.com

1995 births
Living people
Basketball players at the 2020 Summer Olympics
Denver Nuggets draft picks
Denver Nuggets players
Élan Béarnais players
French expatriate basketball people in the United States
French men's basketball players
French people of Czech descent
Grand Rapids Gold players
Le Mans Sarthe Basket players
Liga ACB players
Medalists at the 2020 Summer Olympics
Metropolitans 92 players
National Basketball Association players from France
Olympic basketball players of France
Olympic medalists in basketball
Olympic silver medalists for France
Real Madrid Baloncesto players
Power forwards (basketball)
Sportspeople from Calais